Thrixspermum congestum, commonly known as the cupped hairseed, is an epiphytic or lithophytic orchid that forms small clumps with many thin roots, up to fifteen leathery leaves and many star-shaped white or cream-coloured flowers. This orchid occurs from Papuasia to northern Australia.

Description
The middle lobe is short, fleshy and hairy with a short, hairy spur. Flowering occurs sporadically and the flowers open from one to a few at a time.

Taxonomy and naming
The cupped hairseed was first formally described in 1895 by Frederick Bailey who gave it the name Cleisostoma congestum and published the description in Proceedings of the Royal Society of Queensland. In 1967, Alick Dockrill changed the name to Thrixspermum congestum. The specific epithet (congestum) is a Latin word meaning "collected", "dense" or "thick".

Distribution and habitat
Thrixspermum congestum grows on mangroves and rainforest trees in humid but airy situations. It occurs in New Guinea, the Solomon Islands, New Caledonia, Vanuatu and Australia. In Australia it is found on Melville Island and between the Iron Range and the Tully River in Queensland.

References

congestum
Orchids of Australia
Orchids of New Guinea
Plants described in 1895